Lopera is a city located in the province of Jaén, Spain. According to the 2014 census, the municipality has a population of 3,837 inhabitants.

History

Spanish Civil War
The Battle of Lopera took place between 27 and 29 December 1936 during the Spanish Civil War. This battle took place during the Nationalist's Aceituna offensive. On 27 December, the XIV International Brigade launched an attack in order to occupy the Nationalist-held town of Lopera, but the attack failed after two days and the Brigade suffered appalling casualties.

References

External links

Municipalities in the Province of Jaén (Spain)